Zaoui is a surname. Notable people with the surname include:

Ahmed Zaoui, Algerian academic
Amin Zaoui (born 1956), Algerian novelist
Mohamed Zaoui (born 1960), Algerian boxer
Mohamed Zaoui (footballer) (born 1980), French footballer
Samir Zaoui (born 1976), Algerian footballer